Eustace High School is a public high school located in Eustace, Texas (USA) and classified as a 3A school by the UIL.  It is part of the Eustace Independent School District located in northwestern Henderson County.  In 2015, the school was rated "Met Standard" by the Texas Education Agency.

Athletics
The Eustace Bulldogs compete in these sports - 

Cross Country, Volleyball, Football, Basketball, Powerlifting, Golf, Track, Softball & Baseball

State Titles
Girls Cross Country 
2013(2A), 2014(3A)

References

External links
Eustace ISD

Schools in Henderson County, Texas
Public high schools in Texas